H. Beatty Chadwick (born 1936) is the current American record holder for the longest time being held in civil contempt of court. In 1995, a judge ruled that Chadwick hid millions of U.S. dollars in overseas bank accounts so that he would not have to pay the sums to his ex-wife during their divorce. He was incarcerated until such time as he could present $2.5 million to the Delaware County Court in Pennsylvania. Chadwick maintains that the money was lost in bad investments and therefore he cannot surrender money he does not possess. Although never charged with a crime, H. Beatty Chadwick spent fourteen years of his life in prison.

On July 10, 2009, Chadwick was ordered released from prison by Delaware County Judge Joseph Cronin, who determined his continued incarceration had lost its coercive effect and would not result in him surrendering the money.

References

People from Delaware County, Pennsylvania
Prisoners and detainees of Pennsylvania
1936 births
Living people